This is a list of notable gates in Greece.

See also 
 List of castles in Greece
 List of fountains in Greece

Gates
Greece